Neoplecostomus franciscoensis is a species of armored catfish endemic to Brazil where it is found in the headwaters of the Das Velhas and Paraopeba River basins.  This species grows to a length of  SL.

References
 

franciscoensis
Fish of South America
Fish of Brazil
Endemic fauna of Brazil
Taxa named by Francisco Langeani-Neto
Fish described in 1990